The Liguilla of the 2011–12 Liga de Ascenso season is a final knockout tournament involving seven teams of the Liga de Ascenso. The winner will qualify to the playoff match vs the Clausura 2011 winner. However, if the winner of both tournaments is the same team, the team would be promoted to the 2012–13 Mexican Primera División season without playing the Promotional Final.

Teams
The first team in the general table qualified for the semi-finals. The six next best teams in the general table qualified to the quarter-finals.

Bracket
The six best teams after the first place play two games against each other on a home-and-away basis. The winner of each match up is determined by aggregate score.

The teams were seeded one to seven in quarterfinals, and will be re-seeded one to four in semifinals, depending on their position in the general table. The higher seeded teams play on their home field during the second leg.

 If the two teams are tied after both legs, the higher seeded team advances.
 Teams are re-seeded every round.
 The winner will qualify to the playoff match vs the Clausura 2011 winner. However, if the winner is the same in both tournaments, they would be the team promoted to the 2012–13 Mexican Primera División season without playing the Promotional Final

Quarter-finals

|}

Kickoffs are given in local time (UTC-6 unless stated otherwise).

First leg

Second leg

León advanced 3 – 0 on aggregate

Neza advanced 3 – 2 on aggregate

Correcaminos advanced because of their better position on the league table

Semi-finals

|}

Kickoffs are given in local time (UTC-6 unless stated otherwise).

First leg

Second leg

Final

|}

Kickoffs are given in local time (UTC-6 unless stated otherwise).

First leg

Second leg

Goalscorers
4 goals
 Eder Pacheco (León)

3 goals

 Luciano Emílio (Neza)
 Rodrigo Prieto (Neza)

2 goals

 Diego Menghi (Correcaminos)
 Antonio González Arias (Correcaminos)
 Jesús Padilla (La Piedad)
 Luis Ángel Mendoza (La Piedad)
 Roberto Nurse (La Piedad)
 Nelson Sebastián Maz (León)

1 goal

 Cristian Rojas (Altamira)
 Eliazar Vázquez (Altamira)
 Roberto Nicolás Saucedo (Correcaminos)
 Raymundo Torres (Correcaminos)
 Hugo Sánchez (Correcaminos)
 Diego Olsina (Correcaminos)
 Tomás Domínguez (Correcaminos)
 Jesús Armando Sánchez (La Piedad)
 Gregorio Torres (León)
 Carlos Alberto Peña (León)
 Jesús Isijara (Necaxa)
 Víctor Lojero (Necaxa)

References

Ascenso MX